Best Laid Plans may refer to:

Film 
 Best Laid Plans (1999 film), an American crime film
 Best Laid Plans (2012 film), a British film based on Of Mice and Men

Television 
 The Best Laid Plans (TV series), a 2014 Canadian television sitcom based on the Fallis novel of the same name
 Best Laid Plans (web series), a 2010 American comedy web series
 "The Best Laid Plans" (Three's Company), an episode from the third season of the TV series Three's Company
 "Best Laid Plans" (The Unit), an episode from the fourth season of the TV series The Unit
 "Best Laid Plans" (Once Upon a Time), an episode from the fourth season of the TV series Once Upon a Time
 "Best Laid Plans", an episode from the sixth season of the TV series Burn Notice
 "Best Laid Plans", an episode from the second season of the animated web TV series Voltron: Legendary Defender
 "Best Laid Plans...", an episode from the web series Critical Role
"Best Laid Plans", an episode from Atypical.

Literature 
 The Best Laid Plans, a 1997 novel by Sidney Sheldon
 The Best Laid Plans, a 2008 novel by Terry Fallis
The Best Laid Plans, a 2020 novel by Cameron Lund
 Best Laid Plans (comics), a comic book story

Music 
 Best Laid Plans (Sandra McCracken album)
 Best Laid Plans (David Torn album)
 "Best Laid Plans", a 2010 song by James Blunt from Some Kind of Trouble

See also
 "To a Mouse", a 1785 poem by Robert Burns, whose title is often misquoted as "The best-laid plans of mice and men oft go awry"